Lewis Chapel is an unincorporated community in Sequatchie County, Tennessee, United States.  It is located in the eastern part of the county atop the Cumberland Plateau.  Tennessee State Route 111 connects the community to Dunlap in the Sequatchie Valley to the west and Soddy-Daisy and the outskirts of Chattanooga in the Tennessee Valley to the east.

Lewis Chapel was probably named for the Reverend Edgar R. Lewis, an early minister in the area.

References

Unincorporated communities in Sequatchie County, Tennessee
Unincorporated communities in Tennessee